Henry Parham (November 15, 1921 – July 4, 2021) was an African American veteran of D-Day invasion and WWII.

Born November 15, 1921, in Greenville, Virginia, Parham was drafted in 1942 to serve in the Second World War. He landed on Omaha Beach on June 6, 1944, as part of Operation Overlord. His battalion, the 320th Very Low Altitude Anti-Aircraft Barrage Balloon Battalion, downed 73 planes through the use of barrage balloons. He was to have served in the War in the Pacific after VE Day, but his transport was delayed due to mechanical problems and Japan surrendered before he shipped out. He was awarded the Legion of Honor in 2013. At the time of his death on July 4, 2021, he was the "last surviving African American combat veteran of D-Day".

References

External links
I Am the American Legion profile
New York Times: Henry Parham, Who Fought in a Black Unit on D-Day, Dies at 99

1921 births
2021 deaths
Military personnel from Virginia
African Americans in World War II
United States Army personnel of World War II
People from Augusta County, Virginia
Recipients of the Legion of Honour
21st-century African-American people
African-American United States Army personnel